Muhammad Shafiqur Rahman is a journalist and Bangladesh Awami League politician who is the incumbent member of parliament for Chandpur-4.

Career
Rahman is the former president of the Jatiya Press Club He was elected to parliament from Chandpur-4 as a Bangladesh Awami League candidate on 30 December 2018.

References

Awami League politicians
Living people
11th Jatiya Sangsad members
1949 births